"Cy est Pourtraicte, Madame Ste Ursule, et les Unze Mille Vierges" is a poem in Wallace Stevens's first book of poetry, Harmonium. It was first published in 1915 in the magazine Rogue, so it is in the public domain. Butell characterizes it as one of the first two poems (the other is "Tea") to "successfully combine wit and elegance". They are the earliest poems to be collected later in Harmonium.

Interpretation
The poem describes a woman and her prayer ceremony in a garden, and the Lord's religiously unorthodox response. If the "true subject" of the poem is an erotic moment, the "poetry of the subject" is a delicate poetic bouquet.(For more on this distinction see "Le Monocle de Mon Oncle".) Or one might follow Joan Richardson in viewing it as a record of Stevens's relationship with his wife, Elsie, disguised as a mock-medieval legend to "throw anyone who might be curious completely off the scent." Elsie did not like the poem's "mocking spirit", and one editor, Harriet Monroe, wrote a rejection letter to Stevens in 1915 that characterizes this and other submitted poems as "recondite, erudite, provocatively obscure, with a kind of modern-gargoyle grin to them --- Aubrey-Beardsleyish in the making." She advised him to "chase his mystically mirthful and mournful muse out of the nether darkness."

Bates speculates that the poem's title comes from a fifteenth-century French translation of the Legenda Aurea. It would have identified a simple woodcut of the martyrdom of Saint Ursula and her eleven thousand followers at the hands of the Huns. He sees the poem as lifting the veil which obscures "the subliminal side of religious piety."

Notes

References 

 Bates, Milton J. Wallace Stevens: A mythology of self. University of California Press, 1985.
 Buttel, Robert. Wallace Stevens: The Making of Harmonium. Princeton University Press, 1967.

1915 poems
American poems
Poetry by Wallace Stevens